The  is a major railway line owned by JR Group companies in western Japan, connecting Kōbe Station and Moji Station, largely paralleling the coast of the Inland Sea, in other words, the southern coast of western Honshu. The San'yō Shinkansen line largely parallels its route. The name Sanyō derived from the ancient region and highway San'yōdō, the road on the sunny (south) side of the mountains.

The Sanyō Main Line is operated by two JR companies:

 West Japan Railway Company (JR West)  JR Kobe Line, San'yō Line
 Kyushu Railway Company (JR Kyushu) San'yō Line
A short section connecting Kitakyushu Freight Terminal also forms part of the Sanyō Main Line.

Basic data
Operators, distances: .
West Japan Railway Company (Category-1, Services and tracks)
From Kobe to Shimonoseki: .
From Hyōgo to Wadamisaki: .
Kyushu Railway Company (Category-1, Services and tracks)
From Shimonoseki to Moji: .
Japan Freight Railway Company (Category-2, Services)
From Kobe to Kitakyushu Freight Terminal: .
Gauge: 
Stations:
Passenger stations: 124
Freight terminals: 5
Track:
Quadruple-track line:
From Kobe to Nishi-Akashi: .
From Kaitaichi to Hiroshima: .
Double-track line:
From Nishi-Akashi to Kaitaichi: .
From Hiroshima to Moji: .
Single-track line:
From Hyōgo to Wadamisaki
Electrification: Entire line (1,500 V DC. Excluding inside Moji Station and Kitakyūshū Freight Terminal, which is 20,000 V AC, 60 Hz.)
Railway signalling:
From Kobe to Moji: Automatic
From Hyōgo to Wadamisaki: Special Automatic (Track Circuit Detection); a simplified automatic system.
Maximum speed at service:
From Kobe to Himeji: 
From Himeji to Okayama: Tilting trains , others 
From Okayama to Shimonoseki: 
From Shimonoseki to Moji: 
From Hyōgo to Wadamisaki: 
CTC centers:
From Kobe to Kamigōri: Shin-Ōsaka Operation Control Center
From Kamigōri to Itozaki: Okayama Transportation Control Room
From Itozaki to Shimonoseki: Hiroshima Operation Control Center
From Shimonoseki to Moji: Hakata Operation Control Center
CTC system:
From Kobe to Kamigōri: Safety Urban Network Traffic System (SUNTRAS)

Stations

From Kobe to Himeji (JR Kobe Line)

●: Trains stop at all times
｜: Trains pass at all times
▲: Eastbound trains pass in the morning
○: Weekday mornings only

From Himeji to Itozaki
All trains except Limited Express trains stop at all stations in this section.
Rapid trains coming from Osaka/Kobe area become local trains after Akashi and Special Rapid trains stop at all stations west of Himeji, operating up to Kamigōri or through to the Akō Line.

From Itozaki to Tokuyama (Hiroshima City Network)
A: Akiji liner rapid service (through to the Kure Line)
C: City liner rapid service (limited weekend service only)
●: All trains stop
｜: Trains pass at all times
○: All trains stop, limited service

Tokuyama to Moji
All trains stop at all stations in this section

Rolling stock

JR West

Limited Express
 285 series EMUs (Sunrise Izumo/Sunrise Seto service)
 381 series EMUs (Yakumo service)
 KiHa 187 series DMUs (Super Inaba service)
 Chizu Express HOT7000 series (Super Hakuto service)

Local trains
 105 series EMUs
 113 series EMUs
 115 series EMUs
 117 series EMUs
 123 series EMUs
 207 series EMUs
 213 series EMUs
 221 series EMUs
 223-1000/2000/6000 series EMUs
 225-0/100 series EMUs
 321 series EMUs
 227-0 series

JR Kyushu
 415-1500 series EMUs

History

The entire line between Kobe Station and Shimonoseki Station was originally opened by the private Sanyō Railway company. The section between Hyōgo Station (in Kobe) and Akashi Station (in Akashi, Hyōgo) opened first in 1888. In 1889 the line was extended to the east to Kobe Station (as a dual track section) and Tatsuno Station (in Tatsuno, Hyōgo Prefecture) to the west. The Sanyō Railway was progressively extended to the west, reaching Okayama and then Fukuyama in 1891, Hiroshima in 1894 and in 1901 it reached Bakan (now Shimonoseki) Station. Under the Railway Nationalization Act of 1906 it was purchased by the Japanese government and renamed Sanyō Main Line.

Duplication
The Hyogo – Himeji section was duplicated in 1899, and the Hiroshima – Kaitaichi section in 1903. After the line was nationalised, further duplications occurred between Kamigori – Yoshinaga in 1910/11, Hatabu – Shimonoseki in 1915 and Himeji – Agaho in 1917. Work to duplicate the remainder of the line commenced in 1921, and opened in stages until completed in 1930, with the exception of the section between Iwakuni and Kushigahama, where construction of a new direct line had commenced. This direct line, which bypassed the coastal section via Yanai involved significant tunnelling, and unexpected geological instability delayed completion of the line until 1934, and then as a single track. Although the new line became the Sanyo Main Line at that time, in 1944 the original coastal alignment was duplicated and returned to the formal Sanyo Main Line, with the former bypass line becoming the Gantoku Line.

Electrification
The Kobe – Akashi section was electrified in 1934, extended to Himeji in 1958, Hiroshima in 1962 and (except for the Wadamisaki Line, which was electrified in 2001) the entire line was electrified in 1964, to coincide with the opening of the Tōkaidō Shinkansen between Tokyo and Shin-Osaka the same year.

Deviation/extension
The Sanyō Main Line approximately parallels the Inland Sea but some sections could be shortened by tunnels. In 1934, the Gantoku Line between Iwakuni and Tokuyama was opened and replaced the former line which traverses Yanai adjacent to the Inland Sea. In 1944, this new alignment was replaced again by the previous coastal alignment because the coastal line was upgraded to dual tracks.

The Sanyō Main Line was connected to Kyushu by ferry from Shimonoseki and Shimonosekiko Station (Port Shimonoseki). In 1942, the Kanmon Tunnel under the Kanmon Straits was completed and the Sanyō Main Line was extended to Moji Station. A second tunnel duplicating the section opened in 1944.

Service variations
Prior to the opening of the Sanyo Shinkansen, many expresses operated on the Sanyō Main Line and it serves as a major transport corridor through Western Honshu and connecting to Kyushu. The Shinkansen was extended as the Sanyō Shinkansen line, first to Okayama Station in 1972, and then to Hakata Station in 1975. On both occasions, many express services on the Sanyo Main Line were withdrawn, and since 1972, the line has been mainly used by local and freight services. CTC signalling was commissioned between Mihara and Shimonoseki in 1984.

Service disruptions
The section between Kobe and Nishi Akashi was severely damaged by the 1995 Great Hanshin earthquake, and took ten weeks to repair.

The 2018 Japan floods resulted in the Okayama – Shimonoseki section closing on 6 July 2018. The majority of services were restored between 8 July – 18 July of that year, but the Yanai – Tokuyama section remained out of service until 9 September of that year.

Former connecting lines

 Hyogo station – A 5 km lne to the Hyogo Port operated between 1911 and 1984.
 Tsuchiyama station – A 4 km line to Befu-Ko operated between 1923 and 1984. It is connected to the Sanyo Electric Railway Main Line at Befu.
 Kakogawa station – The Banshu Railway Co. opened an  line to Takasago-Minato in 1913/1914. The line was nationalised in 1943, and closed in 1984.
 Himeji station – The Bantan Railway Co. built a  line east to Shikama-Kou (near Kakogawa), opened in 1895 and closed in 1986.
 Aboshi station – 
The Tatsuno Electric Railway Co. opened a   gauge line electrified at 600 VDC from Shingu-Cho to Aboshiko between 1909 and 1915 which connected at this station. The line closed in 1934.

A 6 km line to Hamadako operated between 1943 and 1989.

 Une station – The Ako Railway operated a   gauge line to Banshu-Ako on the Ako Line between 1921 and 1951.
 Wake station –  The Dowa Mining Co. opened a  line between Nishi-Katakamito on the Ako Line and Yanahara, to haul iron sulphide ore, between 1923 and 1931. Passenger services commenced in 1931, freight services ceased in 1988 and the line closed in 1991.
 Takashima station – The Saidaiji Railway Company operated a  gauge line between its namesake town and Korakuen between 1911 and 1962.
 Kasaoka station – The Ikasa Railway Co. operated a   gauge line to Ihara between 1913 and 1971. It had a 6 km branch from Kitagawa to Yakage that operated between 1921 and 1967. At Ihara it connected to the company's line to Kannabe on the Fukuen Line.
 Fukuyama station – The Tomo Light Railway Co. operated a   gauge line to its namesake town between 1913/1914 and 1954.
 Onomichi station – The Hiroshima Prefectural Government opened a  line electrified at 600 V DC to Shoharachi in 1925/1926. It closed between 1957 and 1964.
 Hiroshima station – 
The Sanyo Railway Co. was commissioned by the Japanese Army to build a  line to Ujina Port following the outbreak of the First Sino-Japanese War in 1894. In 1897 the company leased the line from the Army and commenced a passenger service, and when the company was nationalised in 1906, ownership of the line transferred from the Army to JGR. The Army leased the line in 1915 for use during WW1 and subsequent hostilities in China, and passenger services were suspended between 1919 and 1930. The line was not damaged by the atomic bomb attack, but was damaged by Typhoon Marurazaki which hit the area 6 weeks later. Passenger service ceased in 1972, and the line closed in 1986.

The Kirin Brewery operated a  line to its complex between 1937 and 1986.
 
 Iwakuni station – The Iwakuni Electric Railway Co. opened a 6 km line to Shinmachi, electrified at 600 V DC, between 1909 and 1912. The line closed in 1929 when the parallel Gantoku Line opened.
 Hofu station – A  line to Hori operated 1919/1920 to 1964.
 Shin-Yamaguchi station – The Dainippon Railway Co. opened a  line from Ogori (as Shin-Yamaguchi was called until 2003) to Yamaguchi in 1908, which closed in 1913 when the JGR opened its parallel line.
 Ube station – The Funaki Railway Co. opened a   gauge line in 1916. The line was converted to 1067mm gauge in 1922, and extended  to Kibe in 1926. The last  closed in 1944, and the rest of the line in 1961.
 Ozuki station – The Nagato Railway Co. opened an  line to Nishi-Cho in 1918. JGR assumed control of the line as a wartime measure in 1942, a situation that continued until 1949. The line closed in 1956.
 Hatabu station – The Choshu Railway Co. opened a  line from Higashi-Mozeki to Kogushi in 1914. A proposed extension to Nagato was not built due to funding constraints, but the line was electrified at 600 V DC in 1926. The company merged with the Sanyo Electric Railway in 1928, and the line closed in 1971.

See also
JR Kobe Line

References

 
1067 mm gauge railways in Japan
Railway lines opened in 1872